Petite Île Bois Mangue (French for "Little Mango Wood Island") is a 9 ha island on the Peros Banhos Atoll in the Chagos Archipelago of the British Indian Ocean Territory.  It is part of the Peros Banhos strict nature reserve and has been identified as an Important Bird Area by BirdLife International because of its significance as a breeding site for lesser noddies, of which 12,000 pairs were recorded in a 2004 survey.

References

Important Bird Areas of the British Indian Ocean Territory
Seabird colonies
Chagos Archipelago
Nature reserves